Joscelin Yeo Wei Ling (born 2 May 1979) is a former Nominated Member of Parliament (NMP) from Nov 2006 to Apr 2011 and a former competitive swimmer from Singapore. Yeo won 40 gold medals at the Southeast Asian Games. She also represented Singapore in the Asian Games, Commonwealth Games and Summer Olympics. Yeo was elected as a Rhodes Scholar but never took up the scholarship. During the 2012 London Olympics, she was a TV analyst for certain Asian markets on ESPN Star Sports.

Yeo began her international swimming career at age 11, at the Asia-Pacific swim meet in Jakarta, Indonesia. She swam at almost every major international meet, including the Southeast Asian Games (8 times), the Asian Games (4), the Olympics (4), and the Commonwealth Games (3). She ended her 16-year swimming career in early 2007.

Education 
Yeo studied at Methodist Girls' School.

Swimming career
Yeo started competitive swimming at the age of 11 at the Asia-Pacific swim meet held in Jakarta, Indonesia in 1990. She won six individual golds, one relay gold and silver during the meet and set six individual records and two relay records.

Olympics
Yeo swam for Singapore at four consecutive Olympics (1992, 1996, 2000 and 2004).

Asian Games
Yeo competed in four Asian Games (1994, 1998, 2002 and 2006). In the 1994 Games and the 2002 Games, she won bronze medals in the 100 Butterfly and was the only Singapore swimmer to win a medal at both Games. The 2006 Games was her last international competition.

Southeast Asian Games
Yeo swam at eight SEA Games (1991-2003), and currently hold the record of the most gold medals in SEA Games history with 40 gold medals, surpassing fellow Singaporean swimmer Patricia Chan's record of 39 gold medals.

In 1991, Yeo made her SEA Games debut in Manila as a 12-year-old. She won several silvers and bronzes.

In 1993, with the Games held in Singapore, Yeo won nine gold medals, which included 7 individual and 2 relay races. At the Games, she lost only one race: the 400 IM to compatriot Ooi Yufen May.

In 1995, in Chiangmai, Yeo also won the same seven individual races as in 1993, but lost out on the two relays. She was also the only gold medallist in the Singapore swimming squad.

In the 1997 SEA Games, Yeo won three gold medals.

In the 1999 Games, Yeo won six gold medals, all in Games Records. She was slated for 12 events, but pulled out of the fourth day of competition, due to a right shoulder injury. The only individual race she lost was the 400 Free, where she managed a bronze, finishing behind Pilin Tachakittiranan of Thailand and compatriot Bouvron Mei-Yen Christel.

In 2001, Yeo took part in lesser events as compared to previous SEA games. Yeo won three gold medals.

In 2003, Yeo won six gold medals, inclusive of two relay golds. This helped the Singapore women's swim team to clinch their first relay success since 1993.

In 2005, Yeo participated in her last SEA Games in Manila, the same city where she debuted for SEA Games. Yeo won six golds. In the 100 Butterfly, Yeo also finally finished in under one minute, winning the race in 59.91s.

World record
Yeo and her University of California, Berkeley teammates Haley Cope, Staciana Stitts and Praphalsai Minpraphal broke the 4x50 Medley Relay (Short-course) World record in 2000 with a time of 1:49.23.

Retirement
Yeo originally wanted to call it a day after the 2005 SEA Games. But after a splendid performance, she decided to continue till the 2008 Beijing Olympics. This decision saw her swim at the 2006 Melbourne Commonwealth Games and the 2006 Asian Games. On 30 January 2007, Yeo announced her retirement at a press conference saying she did not have the motivation to go on with another year of training till Beijing, and retired at 28.

National records 
200 m individual medley - 2:16.86, 23 May 2004, 2004 Santa Clara International Swim Meet

Post-swimming career
Yeo opened a swim school, called Yeo's Aquatics, along with her elder brother Leonard. She is also actively involved in church work, working as a mentor within the Youth ministry of New Creation Church.

In 2009, Yeo became a non-elected Nominated Member of Parliament for a term of two-and-a-half years, the youngest of her batch.

She made a cameo appearance in Singapore's MediaCorp TV Channel 5 Phua Chu Kang Pte Ltd playing herself, in the eighth season of the show, where the main character challenges her and fails.

On 7 June 2009, Yeo with Canagasabai Kunalan were unveiled as the two deputy mayors of the Youth Olympic Village for the 2010 Summer Youth Olympics held in Singapore.

Accolades 
Yeo was awarded Singapore's Sportsgirl of the Year award in 1994, and the Sportswoman of the Year awards in 1993, 1995 and 1999. She was prevented from winning any more due to a rule that stopped athletes from winning more than three times. This rule has since been lifted.

Autobiography
In 2004, before the 2004 Olympics, Yeo released her autobiography, titled On the Move: My Career, My Life, which chronicled all the milestones in her life and swimming career, and also nuggets she shared about her national teammates.

Personal life
Yeo is married to Joseph Christopher Purcell, born 1983, a pastor of New Creation Church in Singapore, on 9 July 2010 in HortPark. Both are actively involved in the youth ministry of New Creation.

Yeo and Purcell have 3 boys.

References

External links
 
Joscelin Yeo biography
Singapore Swimming Association

Singaporean Nominated Members of Parliament
Singaporean female breaststroke swimmers
Singaporean female butterfly swimmers
Singaporean female freestyle swimmers
Singaporean female medley swimmers
Alumni of the University of Oxford
California Golden Bears women's swimmers
Olympic swimmers of Singapore
Swimmers at the 1992 Summer Olympics
Swimmers at the 1996 Summer Olympics
Swimmers at the 2000 Summer Olympics
Swimmers at the 2004 Summer Olympics
University of Texas at Austin alumni
Singaporean people of Chinese descent
Singaporean Charismatics
Living people
1979 births
Asian Games medalists in swimming
Swimmers at the 1994 Asian Games
Swimmers at the 2002 Asian Games
Swimmers at the 2006 Asian Games
Commonwealth Games competitors for Singapore
Swimmers at the 1994 Commonwealth Games
Swimmers at the 2002 Commonwealth Games
Swimmers at the 2006 Commonwealth Games
Asian Games bronze medalists for Singapore
Medalists at the 1994 Asian Games
Medalists at the 2002 Asian Games
Southeast Asian Games gold medalists for Singapore
Southeast Asian Games silver medalists for Singapore
Southeast Asian Games bronze medalists for Singapore
Southeast Asian Games medalists in swimming
Recipients of the Pingat Jasa Gemilang
Competitors at the 1993 Southeast Asian Games
Competitors at the 1995 Southeast Asian Games
Competitors at the 1997 Southeast Asian Games
Competitors at the 1999 Southeast Asian Games
Competitors at the 2001 Southeast Asian Games
Competitors at the 2003 Southeast Asian Games
Competitors at the 2005 Southeast Asian Games
Singaporean women in politics